Caty Dehaene (born 11 December 1965) is a Belgian snooker player. She was runner-up in the 2018 Women's EBSA European Snooker Championship.

Playing career
Caty Dehaene was runner-up in the Belgian Women's snooker Championship in 1995, 2005, 2006, 2012, 2013, 2014, 2016 and 2019.

Dehaene and Wendy Jans won the Ladies European Team Snooker Championship in 2017, beating Anastasia Nechaeva and Daria Sirotina 4–3 in the final.

At the 2018 EBSA European Snooker Championship, Dehaene reached the women's final, with wins of 3–0 against Ewilina Pislewska, 4–1 against Tatjana Vasiljeva and 4–2 against Yana Shut. In the final she lost 0–4 to Jans, who won the title for the sixth year in a row.

Career Highlights

Individual

Team

Notes

References

Belgian snooker players
Female snooker players
1965 births
Living people
20th-century Belgian women
21st-century Belgian women